The 2016 Black Reel Awards, which annually recognize and celebrate the achievements of black people in feature, independent and television films, were announced on Thursday, February 18, 2016. Creed and Straight Outta Compton led all films with nine nominations apiece.

Creed was the big winner of the night winning five awards including Outstanding Picture, Director (Ryan Coogler) and Actor (Michael B. Jordan). Bessie took home three awards followed by American Crime, Beasts of No Nation and Straight Outta Compton with two wins.

Dee Rees, Ryan Coogler, Regina King, Rihanna, Michael B. Jordan, Abraham Attah and Kiersey Clemons were some of the winners earning their first Black Reel Award.

Winners and nominees
Winners are listed first and highlighted in bold.

References

Black Reel Awards
2015 film awards
2016 in American cinema
2016 awards in the United States